The Puerta de Toledo is a gate located in Madrid, Spain. It was declared Bien de Interés Cultural in 1996. Construction began in 1812, but was not completed until 1827.

It was one of the nineteen city gates within the Walls of Philip IV.

Puerta de Toledo metro station in on Line 5 of the Madrid Metro.

See also
 List of post-Roman triumphal arches

References 

Buildings and structures in Embajadores neighborhood, Madrid
City gates in Spain
Bien de Interés Cultural landmarks in Madrid
Neoclassical architecture in Madrid
Monumental gates in Madrid